Hans Heinz Moser (9 May 1936 – 5 April 2017) was a Swiss television and film actor.

Filmography

References

External links 
 

1936 births
Swiss male film actors
People from Bern
20th-century Swiss male actors
21st-century Swiss male actors
Swiss male television actors
2017 suicides
Suicides in Switzerland